The Demographics of Turkmenistan is about the demographic features of the population of Turkmenistan, including population growth, population density, ethnicity, education level, health, economic status,  religious affiliations, and other aspects of the population. The ethnic majority in Turkmenistan call themselves Turkmen.

Demographic trends

The 17 January 1939 census showed a population of 1,251,883, of which 741.5 thousand Turkmen, 232.9 thousand Russians, 107.4 thousand Uzbeks, 61.4 thousand Kazakhs, 19.5 thousand Tatars, 8,300 Iranians, 5,400 Baloch, and 75.5 thousand other nationalities. The population of Turkmenistan increased from 1.5 million in the 1959 census to 4.5 million in the 1995 census. The population continued growing to over 5 million in 2001–2006. According to opposition media, Turkmenistan's population in 2019 was no more than 3.3 million. As of July 2021, anonymous official sources informed opposition news media that the population of Turkmenistan had fallen to between 2.7 and 2.8 million.

According to some sources, deteriorating economic conditions have led to massive emigration of Turkmenistanis to other countries in search of work, possibly as many as 1,879,413 between 2008 and 2018, inclusive.  Primary destinations are Russia, Turkey, and Ukraine. Between 2013 and 2019, the number of emigrants to Russia from Turkmenistan doubled. As one consequence, in 2018 Turkmen authorities began barring some citizens, particularly those younger than 40 years of age, from leaving the country in an apparent effort to stem emigration.

Vital statistics

UN estimates

Registered births and deaths

Fertility and Births
Total Fertility Rate (TFR) (Wanted Fertility Rate) and Crude Birth Rate (CBR):

Life expectancy 

Source: UN World Population Prospects

Ethnic groups
The table shows the ethnic composition of Turkmenistan's population (in percent) between 1926 and 1995. There has been a sharp decline in the Slavic ethnic groups (Russians and Ukrainians) and also Kazakhs and Tatars since independence (as captured in the 1979 and 1995 censuses). Uzbeks are now the second largest ethnic group in Turkmenistan, with Russians relegated to the third place. According to data announced in Ashgabat in February 2001, 91% of the population are Turkmen, 3% are Uzbeks, and 2% are Russians. Between 1989 and 2001 the number of Turkmen in Turkmenistan doubled (from 2.5 to 4.9 million), while the number of Russians dropped by two-thirds (from 334,000 to slightly over 100,000).

Azerbaijanis in Turkmenistan 

The significant presence of Azerbaijanis in Turkmenistan dates from the early twentieth century. A massive influx of Azerbaijanis migrated to Turkmenistan due to the devastating 1902 Shamakhi earthquake.

Beyler of Shamakhi settled mainly in Krasnovodsk and Ashabad (now known as Turkmenbashi and Ashgabad respectively). The Beyler's wealth spurred a big "investment boom" in Turkestan (Turkmenistan). Beyler began to build new buildings by using modernized technological equipment. In a short time, a large number of hotels, houses, teahouses, caravanserais, mosques, madrasas, schools, and theaters were built.

Azerbaijanis were also involved in the fight against the Bolsheviks. Azerbaijanis were found among the Basmachi fighters led by Enver Pasha, and some helped finance the movement. For decades, the fight against the colonial policy of Bolsheviks failed. Most of the members of Basmachi movement were killed in the battles of the independence of Turkestan, the other part were exiled to labor camps of Gulag.

During the 70 years of Soviet rule, Azerbaijani Bays and warriors were declared as a national enemy and their names were erased from history books. Today they have been rehabilitated.

At the period of the collapse of the USSR, 36,000 Azerbaijanis lived in Turkmenistan, now their population has reached over 52,000.

While living in Turkmenistan, Azerbaijanis have contributed to the culture and art of the country. Musical instruments such as Gaval, Nagara, Tar, Saz and Kamancheh have gained popularity in Turkmenistan, and Azerbaijani dishes like dovga, syabzi-frying, and sweet rice have become favorite dishes of Turkmenistanis. Today, the Azerbaijani community of Turkmenistan has its own mosques, musicians, and dancers.

Some famous Azerbaijanis from Turkmenistan are: the chief of Baku City Executive Power Hajibala Abutalibov, Elnur Huseynov who represented Azerbaijan twice in the Eurovision Song Contest and the winner of The Voice of Turkey, singer Natavan Habibi, a well-known geologist Shamil Azizbeko, film director Ajdar Ibrahimov, national heroes of Azerbaijan Fakhraddin Musayev and Tahir Bagirov, the first woman in the oil industry, and the Minister of Foreign Affairs from 1959 to 1983. Tahira Tahirova also was born in Turkmenistan.

CIA World Factbook demographic statistics

The following demographic statistics are from the CIA World Factbook as of September 2018, unless otherwise indicated.

Languages
Turkmen (official) 72%
 Russian 12%
 Uzbek 9%
 Azeri 1%
Other 7%

Religion
Islam 93%
Eastern Orthodox 6%
Unknown 1%

Ethnic groups
Turkmen 85%
Uzbek 5.8%
Russian 5.1%
Azerbaijanis 1.2%
Other 1%

Age structure 
0-14 years:  25.79% (male 699,612/female 680,583)
15-24 years: 18.39% (male 495,025/female 488,930)
25-54 years: 43.18% (male 1,147,044/female 1,163,762)
55-64 years: 7.9% (male 199,363/female 223,443)
65 years and over: 4.74% (male 110,505/female 143,010) (2017 est.)

Median age 
total: 27.9 years
male: 27.5 years
28.4 years (2017 est.)

Sex ratio
at birth: 1.04 male(s)/female
under 15 years: 1.03 male(s)/female
15-24 years: 1.01 male(s)/female
25-54 years: 0.98 male(s)/female
55-64 years: 0.89 male(s)/female
65 years and over: 0.77 male(s)/female
total population: 0.98 male(s)/female (2017 est.)

Total fertility rate 
2.03 children born/woman (2022 est.)

Population growth rate 
1.12% (2017 est.)

Life expectancy at birth
total population:70.4 years
male:67.4 years
female:73.6 years (2017 est.)

Nationality
noun:Turkmen(s)
adjective:Turkmen

Literacy
definition:age 15 and over can read and write
total population:98.8%
male: 99.3%
female: 98.3% (1999 est.)

See also
 Demography of Central Asia

References